Dancing with Loneliness is the third single from the 2001 Schiller gold album Weltreise with vocals by singer Kim Sanders. The single was officially released on 26 November 2001 and was peaking at number 73 on German Singles Chart in 2001. The single includes the song ″Wehmut″. The single was released in two versions: A green one and a blue one with different songs. The cover art work shows a graphic of a teardrop. The music video was shot in Italy.

The live version of the song Schiller was recorded on 19 September 2001 during a concert for the television show "2nite" on the German-French TV channel Arte.

Track listing

Maxi single

Version 1 
Single with green cover.

Version 2 
Single with light blue cover.

Vinyl

Credits 

 Producer: Christopher von Deylen, Mirko von Schlieffen
 Recorded by Christopher von Deylen, Mirko von Schlieffen
 Vocals by Kim Sanders
 Bass Guitar and Electric Guitar by Tissy Thiers
 Recorded and mixed at Sleepingroom in Hamburg
 Artwork by Katja Stier

Music video 

The official music video for "Dancing with Loneliness" was produced by Blau Medien GmbH and was shot in 2001 in Italy by German director Marcus Sternberg. It has a length of 3:33 minutes. The video features Kim Sanders and different unknown people in an amusement park. According to the lyrics, everybody of these persons are shown alone in empty amusement rides and some of them are dancing alone. This video makes a complete contrast to the daily business on amusement parks, which are usually full of people. In one scene the name of the "Labirinto di Cristallo" is shown. The music video was shot in the amusement park LunEur in the district EUR in Rome, Italy. It was first aired in September 2001.

Other crew members:

 Director of photography: Felix Storp
 Editor: Kai Kniepkamp
 Producer: Stephan Pauly

Charts 

References

External links
 Official music video of Dancing with Loneliness
 The music video of Dancing with Loneliness
 Dancing with Loneliness live
 The single on Discogs

Schiller (band) songs
Kim Sanders songs
2001 singles
Songs written by Christopher von Deylen
2001 songs